Pachytychius is a genus of true weevils in the beetle family Curculionidae. There are at least 110 described species in Pachytychius.

See also
 List of Pachytychius species

References

Further reading

External links

 

Curculioninae
Articles created by Qbugbot